Hubertus "Huub" Zilverberg (born 13 January 1939 in Goirle) is a Dutch former professional road bicycle racer. In 1962, Zilverberg won a stage in the Tour de France and in the Giro d'Italia.

Major results

1959
Olympia's Tour
1961
Ronde van Vlaanderen (for independents)
Rijen
1962
Grand Prix du Parisien (with Rik Van Looy, Guillaume van Tongerloo, Edgard Sorgeloos, Joseph Planckaert and Peter Post)
Tour de France:
Winner stage 7
Giro d'Italia:
Winner stage 8
Schiedam
Leuze
1963
Rijen
Hulst

References

External links 

Hubertus Zilverberg at FirstCycling.com

1939 births
Living people
Dutch male cyclists
Dutch Tour de France stage winners
Dutch Giro d'Italia stage winners
People from Goirle
Cyclists from North Brabant